Syarhey Kozak (born 17 October 1981) is a Belarusian football coach and former player.

Honours
Dinamo Brest
Belarusian Cup winner: 2006–07

External links

1981 births
Living people
Belarusian footballers
Association football midfielders
Expatriate footballers in Russia
Belarusian expatriate footballers
FC Rotor Volgograd players
FC Dnepr Mogilev players
FC Torpedo Minsk players
FC Gomel players
FC Dynamo Brest players
FC Belshina Bobruisk players
FC Kobrin players
FC Rukh Brest players
Belarusian football managers
Sportspeople from Brest, Belarus